São Vicente Creole is the name given to the variant of Cape Verdean Creole spoken mainly in the São Vicente Island of Cape Verde. It belongs to the Barlavento Creoles branch. This form of the Cape Verdean Creole has about 80,000 to 100,000 speakers primarily in the São Vicente island, but also in a large segment of the Cape Verdean diaspora population. It is the second most widely spoken Cape Verdean creole. It has produced literature from a lot of writers and musicians including Sergio Frusoni and many more.

Characteristics
Besides the main characteristics of Barlavento Creoles the São Vicente Creole has also the following ones:
 The progressive aspect of the present is formed by putting tí tâ before the verbs: tí + tâ + V.
 The stressed final sound  is pronounced . Ex.: já  instead of djâ  “already”, lá  instead of lâ  “there”, and all the verbs that end by ~â, calcá  instead of calcâ  “to press”, pintchá  instead of pintchâ  “to push”, etc.
 The sound  (that originates from Portuguese , written “lh”) is represented by the sound : bói’  instead of bódj’  “dance (noun)”, ôi’  instead of ôdj’  “eye”, spêi’  instead of spêdj’  “mirror”. When it is after the sound , the sound  remains: fídj’  “son”, mídj’  “corn”. When it is immediately after a consonant, the sound  remains: m’djôr  “better”, c’djêr  “spoon”.
Ex. já  instead of djâ  “already”, jantá  instead of djantâ  “to dine”, Jõ’  instead of Djõ’  “John”.
 Existence of a certain kind of vocabulary (also existing in Santo Antão) that does not exist in the other islands. Ex.: dançá instead of badjâ “to dance”, dzê instead of flâ “to say”, falá instead of papiâ “to speak”, guitá instead of djobê “to peek”, ruf’ná instead of fuliâ “to throw”, stód’ instead of stâ “to be”, tchocá instead of furtâ “to steal”, tchúc’ instead of pôrc’ “pig”, etc.

Vocabulary

Grammar

Phonology

Alphabet

Examples of São Vicente Creole

External links
 Criol de Soncente, a page with sample poems
 How do we talk in São Vicente with a French dictionary
 Storias Mindeleneses by Zizim Figueira
 Guidelines for writing the São Vicentean dialect of Criol pdf - version

References

Cape Verdean Creole